The Constitution of the People's Republic of Bangladesh was adopted by the Constituent Assembly on 4 November, 1972 and became effective on 16 December, 1972 one year after Bangladesh's victory in the War of Liberation.  the Constitution has been amended 17 times.
Amending the Constitution of Bangladesh is the process of making changes to the nation's supreme law.

Amendments

First amendment 
Passed on 15 July 1973, the first amendment was made to the Article 47 of the constitution. The amendment inserted an additional clause, Article 47(3), that states that any law regarding prosecution or punishment of war crimes cannot be declared void or unlawful on grounds of unconstitutionality. A new Article 47A was also added, which specifies that certain fundamental rights will be inapplicable in those cases.

Second amendment 
The second amendment of the constitution was passed on 22 September 1973. It suspended some of the fundamental rights of the citizens during a state of emergency. The act made following changes to the constitution:
 Amended articles 26, 63, 72 and 142.
 Substituted Article 33.
 Inserted a new Part IXA to the constitution.

Third amendment 
Third Amendment was passed on 28 November 1974 that brought changes in Article 2 of the constitution. An agreement was made between Bangladesh and India in respect of exchange of certain enclaves and fixation of boundary lines between the countries.

Fourth amendment 
The amendment was passed on 25 January 1975.
 Amended articles 11, 66, 67, 72, 74, 76, 80, 88, 95, 98, 109, 116, 117, 119, 122, 123, 141A, 147 and 148 of the constitution.
 Substituted Articles 44, 70, 102, 115 and 124 of the constitution.
 Amended part III of the constitution out of existence.
 Altered the Third and Fourth Schedule.
 Extended the term of the first Jatiya Sangsad.
 Inserted a new part, VIA in the constitution and.
 Inserted new articles 73A and 116A in the constitution.
Significant changes included:
 The presidential form of government was introduced replacing the parliamentary system.
 A one-party system in place of a multi-party system was introduced;
 the powers of the Jatiya Sangsad were curtailed;
 the Judiciary lost much of its independence;
 the Supreme Court was deprived of its jurisdiction over the protection and enforcement of fundamental rights.

Fifth Amendment 
The Fifth Amendment Act was passed by the Jatiya Sangsad on 6 April 1979. This Act amended the Fourth Schedule to the constitution by adding a new paragraph 18 thereto, which provided that all amendments, additions, modifications, substitutions and omissions made in the constitution during the period between 15 August 1975 and 9 April 1979 (both days inclusive) by any Proclamation or Proclamation Order of the Martial Law Authorities had been validly made and would not be called in question in or before any court or tribunal or authority on any ground whatsoever.

Sixth Amendment 
This Amendment Act was passed 10 July 1981.
The Sixth Amendment Act was enacted by the Jatiya Sangsad with a view to amending Articles 51 and 66 of the 1981 constitution.

Seventh Amendment
The Seventh Amendment Act was passed on 11 November 1986. It amended Article 96 of the constitution; it also amended the Fourth Schedule to the constitution by inserting a new paragraph 19 thereto, providing among others that all proclamations, proclamation orders, Chief Martial Law Administrator's Orders, Martial Law Regulations, Martial Law Orders, Martial Law Instructions, ordinances and other laws made during the period between 24 March 1982 and 11 November 1986 (both days inclusive) had been validly made, and would not be called in question in or before any court or tribunal or authority on any ground whatsoever. In summary, the amendment protected Hussain Muhammad Ershad and his regime from prosecution for actions taken under the years of military rule, following the 1982 coup d'état until the 1986 presidential election.

Eighth Amendment 
This Amendment Act was passed 9 June 1988.
The Constitution (Eighth Amendment) Act, 1988 declared, among others, that Islam shall be state religion (Article 2A) and also decentralised the judiciary by setting up six permanent benches of the High Court Division outside Dhaka (Article 100). Anwar Hussain . Vs. Bangladesh widely known as 8th Amendment case is a famous judgment in the constitutional record of independence Bangladesh. This is the earliest judgment whereby the Supreme Court of Bangladesh as salient down an amendment to the constitution ready by the parliament.

Ninth Amendment 
This Amendment Act was passed on 11 July 1989.

Twelfth Amendment
The Twelfth Amendment Act was passed on 18 September 1991, following a constitutional referendum. It amended Articles 48, 55, 56, 57, 58, 59, 60, 70, 72, 109, 119, 124, 141A and 142, restoring executive powers to the Prime Minister's Office, as per the original 1972 constitution, but which had been held by the President's Office since 1974. Instead, the President became the constitutional head of the state; the Prime Minister became the executive head; the cabinet headed by the Prime Minister became responsible to the Jatiya Sangsad; the post of the Vice President was abolished and the President was required to be elected by the members of the Jatiya Sangsad. Moreover, through Article 59 of the Constitution, this Act ensured the participation of the people's representatives in local government bodies.

Thirteenth Amendment   
The Constitution (Thirteenth Amendment) Act, 1996 (28 March) introduced a non-party Caretaker Government (CtG) system which, acting as an interim government, would give all possible aid and assistance to the Election Commission for holding the general election.
It was declared illegal on 10 May 2011 by the Appellate Division of Supreme Court. Though High Court declared it legal previously on 4 August 2004.

Fourteenth Amendment 
The Fourteenth Amendment was passed on 17 May 2004.The main provision for this amendment is concerned about women in parliament.

Fifteenth amendment 

The Fifteenth Amendment was passed on 30 June 2011 made some significant changes to the constitution. The amendment made following changes to the constitution:
 Increased number of women reserve seats to 50 from existing 45.
 After article 7 it inserted articles 7(a) and 7(b) in a bid to end take over of power through extra-constitutional means.
 Restored secularism and freedom of religion.
 Incorporated nationalism, socialism, democracy and secularism as the fundamental principles of the state policy.
 Acknowledged Sheikh Mujibur Rahman as the Father of the Nation.

Sixteenth amendment 
The 16th amendment of the constitution was passed by the parliament on 22nd September 2014, which gave power to the Jatiya Sangsad to remove judges if allegations of incapability or misconduct against them are proved. On 5 May 2016, the Supreme Court of Bangladesh declared the 16th Amendment illegal and contradictory to the Constitution.

Seventeenth Amendment  
The 17th amendment of the constitution was passed unanimously by the Jatiya Sangsad on 8th July 2018. The amendment extended the tenure of the 50 reserved seats for women for another 25 years.

References

Constitution of Bangladesh
Amendments to the Constitution of Bangladesh